is a Japanese idol group formed in 2015. The members of the group are Rie Takahashi, Yuki Nagaku, and Marika Kouno under Evil Line Records label. Originally, a fictitious idol group consisting of three main characters from the anime Seiyu's Life!, Earphones soon became a real idol group, its three members the voice actresses responsible for their respective characters in the anime.

Members

Discography

Albums

Studio albums

Singles

Videos

Video albums

Music videos

References

External links
 

 
Japanese girl groups
Japanese musical trios
Anime singers
Japanese vocal groups